The 1982–83 Edmonton Oilers season was the Oilers' fourth season in the National Hockey League (NHL) and their second-straight season of finishing with over 100 points, and they won the Smythe Division for the second straight season. The Oilers broke the NHL record for goals in a season with 424, breaking the record they set in the previous season.

Regular season
Wayne Gretzky had another amazing season, scoring 71 goals, while earning an NHL record 125 assists to finish the year with 196 points, winning his fourth Hart Trophy and his third Art Ross Trophy. The Oilers tied the Boston Bruins' 1971 record of four 100—point scorers, as Gretzky, Mark Messier, Glenn Anderson and Jari Kurri each passed the 100-point plateau during the season.

Andy Moog would step it up as the Oilers #1 goaltender, winning a team record 33 games, while posting a team best 3.53 GAA.

Season standings

Schedule and results

Playoffs
In the playoffs, the Oilers would post an 11–1 record in the first 3 rounds, sweeping the Winnipeg Jets in 3 games, defeating the Calgary Flames in 5 games in the first ever Battle of Alberta in the playoffs, and sweep the Chicago Black Hawks in 4 games before facing the 3 time defending Stanley Cup Champions, the New York Islanders.  The Islanders would make short work of the Oilers, sweeping Edmonton in 4 games, and winning their 4th straight Stanley Cup.

Player statistics

Regular season

Playoffs

Records
 424: An NHL team record for most goals in a single season.
418: A new NHL team record for most goals in a single season on April 1, 1983.
 125: An NHL record for most assists in a single season by Wayne Gretzky.
121: A new NHL record for most assists in a single season by Wayne Gretzky on April 1, 1983.
 38: An NHL record for most points in a playoffs by Wayne Gretzky.
36: A new NHL record for most points in a playoffs by Wayne Gretzky on May 12, 1983.
 33: An Oilers record for most wins in a single season by Andy Moog.
29: A new Oilers record for most wins in a single season by Andy Moog on March 13, 1983.
 26: An NHL record for most assists in a playoffs by Wayne Gretzky.
24: A new NHL record for most assists in a playoffs by Wayne Gretzky on May 12, 1983.
 3: Tied NHL record for most short-handed goals in a playoffs by Wayne Gretzky on April 17, 1983.

Milestones

Transactions

Trades

Free agents

Draft picks
Edmonton's draft picks at the 1982 NHL Entry Draft

References

 National Hockey League Guide & Record Book 2007

Edmonton Oilers season, 1982-83
Edmon
Edmonton Oilers seasons
Smythe Division champion seasons
Western Conference (NHL) championship seasons
Ed